Al-Wehda Sports Club (Aden) is a Yemeni football club based in Sheikh Othman, Aden, Yemen.  The club was founded in 1929 and currently competes in the Yemeni League.

The origin and the founding of the club
Al-Wahda Sports Club (Aden) is one of the oldest clubs in the Republic of Yemen and the Arab world, it is the second club to be established in Yemen after Al-Tilal. It was established on July 17, 1929. after a series of integration of the club's in the town of Sheikh Othman, these clubs are:

 Youth Consolidated Club (YCC)
 Al Hilal Sports Club
 Faiha Sports Club

This integration process took place in two phases the first phase in 1973 and the second phase took place in 1975

Achievements
South Yemeni League: 3
1975/76, 1987/88, 1988/89

External links
 Team's profile - kooora.com

Football clubs in Yemen
Association football clubs established in 1929
20th-century establishments in the Aden Protectorate
1929 establishments in the British Empire